Lorraine Ellison (March 17, 1931 – January 31, 1983) was an American soul singer and songwriter known for her recording of the song "Stay with Me" (sometimes known as "Stay With Me Baby") in 1966.

Life and career
Born Marybelle Luraine Ellison, in Philadelphia, Pennsylvania, to a musical family, Ellison sang in churches from the age of six and attended the John Bartram High School. She originally sang gospel music, working in the groups the Ellison Singers and the Golden Chords in the early 1960s. In 1963, Ellison appeared with the Golden Chords on the Introducing The Sweet Chariot The Sensational New Pop Gospel Night Club With Soul Recorded Live album, leading "Wake Me, Shake Me". Ellison also appeared at the Festival of the Two Worlds in Spoleto, Italy. She switched to the R&B genre in 1964 and her first release was a chart entry, "I Dig You Baby" in 1965  on Mercury Records, which reached No. 22 on the US Billboard R&B chart. Initially a slow seller, five months after its release, its reported national sales were 40,000.

After another unsuccessful single with Mercury, she signed with Warner Bros. Records, and in 1966 recorded "Stay with Me" at a last-minute booking, following a studio cancellation by Frank Sinatra. "Stay with Me" reached number 11 in the U.S. Billboard R&B chart and number 64 in the U.S. Billboard Hot 100 chart. The song was produced and written by Jerry Ragovoy. Some of her later single releases were on Warner's subsidiary soul music record label, Loma Records. "Stay with Me" would become her signature song. Her follow-up single was "Heart Be Still" a minor hit in 1967. Ellison also recorded "Try (Just a Little Bit Harder)", a song later covered to more success by Janis Joplin. Peter Jones of Record Mirror rated Ellison's "Try (Just a Little Bit Harder)" 4/5 stars, writing, 'Soul-filled ballad here, intense vocals from Lorraine and the femme vocal group. Intense but same-y'. In May 1967, Ellison was due to tour the UK and Ireland, but cancelled due to illness.

Ellison composed some of her own songs (by herself and with manager and later husband, Sam Bell, who was lead singer of soul vocal group, The Enchanters). She had her own compositions recorded by several other artists, including Jerry Butler, Garnet Mimms, Howard Tate and Dee Dee Warwick. After leaving Warner, she recorded at least two unissued tracks for the then fast-growing Philadelphia International label in her hometown.

Twice-married and using the surname Gonzalez-Keys, Lorraine Ellison gave up the music business to take care of her mother, but continued to sing in church. Ellison died in January 1983 from ovarian cancer at the age of 51.

Discography

Studio albums

Compilation albums

Singles

 Notes

References

External links
Soulwalking.co.uk biography
 Article: A Soul-Singing Dynamo Gets Her Day, by Tom Moon

1931 births
1983 deaths
African-American women singer-songwriters
American gospel singers
American rhythm and blues singer-songwriters
Deaths from ovarian cancer
Musicians from Philadelphia
Loma Records artists
20th-century African-American women singers
Singer-songwriters from Pennsylvania